113 is a French hip hop group, including African and Caribbean roots originating in North and West Africa and the island of Guadeloupe, formed in their most famous song "Tonton du Bled" ("Uncle From The Land"; 'bled' being a term from Maghrebi Arabic).

The group's name comes from the name of the building in a housing estate where the members spent much of their youth; additionally, it's a play on the US hip-hop group 112.

Members
 Rim'K - Abdelkrim Brahmi, born 21 June 1978, of Algerian origin.
 Mokobé - Mokobé Traoré, born 1981, of Malian origin.
 AP - Yohann Duport, of Guadeloupean origin.

Discography

Albums

Studio albums

Albums with Mafia K'1 Fry
2003: La Cerise sur le ghetto
2007: Jusqu'à la mort

Individual albums by 113 collective members
AP
2005: Zone Caraïbes (compilation co-produced by AP)
2009: Discret
Mokobé
2007: Mon Afrique
2011: Africa forever
Rim'K
2004: L'enfant du pays
2007: Famille nombreuse
2009: Maghreb United
2012: Chef de famille
2016: Monster Tape

EPs
1998: Ni Barreaux, Ni Barrières, Ni Frontières (EP)

Mixtapes

Singles

References

French hip hop groups
Musical groups from Île-de-France